Maria Luisa Gabriella of Savoy (17 September 1688 – 14 February 1714), nicknamed La Savoyana, was Queen of Spain by marriage to Philip V. She acted as regent during her husband's absence from 1702 until 1703 and had great influence as a political adviser during the War of the Spanish Succession. Because of her effectiveness, she was well-loved in her adoptive country.

Early life

Childhood
María Luisa Gabriella was born on 17 September 1688, at the Royal Palace of Turin, Savoy. She was the third daughter and second surviving child of Victor Amadeus II, Duke of Savoy and Anne Marie of Orléans, the youngest daughter of Philippe I, Duke of Orléans and Princess Henrietta of England. In her youth, Maria Luisa Gabriella was described as "intelligent, playful, and fun-loving" and had received an excellent education. She remained close to her older sister Maria Adelaide, who later married Louis, Duke of Burgundy, the eldest grandson of Louis XIV.

Engagement
French Prince Philippe, Duke of Anjou recently ascended to the Spanish crown upon the death of his great-uncle, the childless Charles II of Spain. In order to enforce his shaky authority over Spain due to his French birth, Philip V decided to maintain ties with the Duke of Savoy by marrying his daughter Maria Luisa Gabriella, his second cousin through King Louis XIII of France. In mid-1701, Philip V asked for her hand with the permission of his grandfather, King Louis XIV. They were wed by proxy on 12 September 1701, five days before Maria Luisa Gabriella's thirteenth birthday. She arrived to Nice on 18 September and was greeted by Pope Clement XI, who gave her the Golden Rose on 20 September as a ritualistic gift. Within a week, she sailed from Nice for Antibes and was taken to Barcelona.

Queen of Spain

The official wedding took place on 2 November 1701. Philip V was deeply in love with his wife from the start: as would be the case of his next consort, he was sexually dependent on her because his religious scruples prevented him from exercising any sexual life outside of marriage. Unlike what was normal for a Spanish monarch, he usually slept in her bed the entire night, and insisted upon his conjugal rights. Already shortly after their marriage, the French ambassador, the Duke of Gramont reported to Louis XIV that Philip would be completely governed by his spouse as long as he had one, a report that led Louis XIV to warn his grandson not to allow his Queen to dominate him.

In general, the young Queen's influence was beneficial: Maria Luisa Gabriella is described as remarkably mature for her age, politically savvy, articulate and hardworking. She was praised throughout Spain for her regency and had been credited with giving the normally passive Philip V the energy he needed to participate in warfare.

War of Spanish Succession
In 1702, Phillip V was obliged to leave Spain to fight in Naples as part of the ongoing War of Spanish Succession. During her husband's absence, 14-year-old Maria Luisa Gabriella effectively acted as regent from Madrid, insisting upon all complaints being investigated, ordering that the reports were directly sent to her, and working for hours with ministers. She gave audiences to ambassadors and tried to prevent Savoy from joining the enemy, though this goal soon failed. However, her issues successfully encouraged the reorganization of the Junta and considerable monetary donations from several nobles and cities towards the war effort. In 1715, Philip V was eventually recognised as King of Spain and retained most of its colonial possessions, but 
ceded territories in Italy and renounced the French throne for himself and his descendants.

Court Intrigue
French Courtier Marie Anne de La Trémoille, Princesse des Ursins, was a member of the Spanish Queen's household. She would maintain great influence over Maria Luisa Gabriella as her Camarera mayor de Palacio, the chief lady-in-waiting of the Queen's household. Trémoille maintained strong dominance in Spain by using all the rights of proximity to the Queen Regent that her position entitled her to: she was almost constantly in Maria Luisa Gabriella's presence, accompanied her wherever she went as soon as she left her private rooms, followed her to the council meetings where she listened sitting by the side sewing, followed her back to her rooms where she was present at the most intimate personal tasks, dressing and undressing her, and controlling whoever wished to come into her presence. As Philip V actually shared a bedroom with Maria Luisa Gabriella, the Princess came to obtain enormous influence over the King.  In 1704, Trémoille was exiled at the order of King Louis XIV, devastating the rulers. However, in 1705, the Princess returned to Madrid, much to the Queen's joy.

Death
Towards the end of her life, Maria Luisa Gabriella became ill of tuberculosis. She eventually died in Royal Alcazar of Madrid, on 14 February 1714 at the age of 25. The Queen was buried at San Lorenzo de El Escorial. On 16 September 1714, just months after her death, her widower remarried by proxy, to Elisabeth Farnese, the heiress of the Duke of Parma. Her niece, Princess Maria Luisa was named after her.

Issue
By her husband Philip V of Spain, Maria Luisa Gabriella gave birth to the her first child in 1707. She gave birth to three more children, two of whom would survive infancy: 
Louis (25 August 1707 – 31 August 1724): Succeeded his father as King of Spain. Married Louise Élisabeth d'Orléans.
Philip (2 July 1709 – 18 July 1709): Died in infancy.
Philip (7 June 1712 – 29 December 1719): Died in childhood.
Ferdinand (23 September 1713 – 10 August 1759): Succeeded his brother as King of Spain. Married Infanta Maria Barbara of Portugal.

As all of her children were to die without issue, there are no descendants of Maria Luisa Gabriella of Savoy.

Ancestry

References

External links

|-

|-

Royal consorts of Naples
Royal consorts of Sicily
18th-century deaths from tuberculosis
Spanish royal consorts
Regents of Spain
17th-century Italian nobility
1688 births
1714 deaths
Nobility from Turin
Princesses of Savoy
Burials in the Pantheon of Kings at El Escorial
18th-century women rulers
House of Bourbon (Spain)
Tuberculosis deaths in Spain
Daughters of kings